Jek people ( also spelt Jeks, Jeklilar, Jack or Dzhek people) are a Northeast Caucasian ethnic group in Azerbaijan. The Jeks are one of the numerically small Shahdag peoples. The Jeks are a part of the Shahdag group of Dagestani people, and inhabit the northeast of the Azerbaijan Republic and Shahdag plateau of the Great Caucasus. The historical motherland of the Jeks is the Jek village of Quba Rayon, and their native language is Jek language, of the Northeast Caucasian family.

The Jek people are Sunni Muslims.

Gallery

See also 
Jek (Quba)
Jek language

References

External links 

 Tərxan Paşazadə, "Dünyanın nadir etnik qrupu - Azərbaycan cekliləri", Azərbaycan qəzeti
 Большая Энциклопедия в 62 томах: Джеки

Ethnic groups in Azerbaijan
Peoples of the Caucasus
Muslim communities of the Caucasus